Richard Wolfson (25 April 1955 – 1 February 2005) was a British musician, performance artist, cameraman and journalist. He is probably best remembered for the concept album Kaddish which he created with Andy Saunders using the band name Towering Inferno.

Life
Wolfson was born to an orthodox Jewish family in Solihull and educated at Solihull School. In his early years he learnt piano and guitar and at the age of 14 formed Solstice, a folk band with Mark Chapman, heavily influenced by the work of the Incredible String Band. At the age of 17, he formed the first of a succession of bands with Andy Saunders. Towering Inferno was conceived as a large scale multimedia stage project, involving film and electronics. Wolfson and Saunders met with and were impressed by the Hungarian poet Endre Szkárosi and his cryptic poetry was a stimulus for their major work, the stage show and album Kaddish, which was created over five years and is an extended reflection on the Jewish prayer of the same name, including references to the history and folk-lore of Central and Eastern Europe and to the Shoah. The music includes adaptations of Hungarian folk-songs, some of them sung by Márta Sebestyén and Szkárosi, Jewish chant and the sound of the shofar, and dramatic electronic sound-effects. Other musical guests included John Marshall, Chris Cutler, Tim Hodgkinson and Elton Dean.

Kaddish was originally released in 1993 and described by its creators as 'a dream history of Europe in the wake of the Holocaust'. Brian Eno called it 'the most frightening record I have ever heard'. It received outstanding reviews from both the popular music and mainstream press, and performances were given all over the world.

Wolfson also became a successful journalist, writing on music and film for the Daily Telegraph and the Financial Times. He died of an aortic aneurysm. Saunders with Cutler, Jah Wobble, Bob Drake, Dave Kerman, Glyn Perrin, Greg Skerman, and others are completing a second Towering Inferno album, started before Wolfson's death.

Discography
Kaddish by Towering Inferno, Island Records CD 8039 524106-2 (1993)

Sources
 Obituary, The Times
 Peter Jones, Towering Inferno: Recording Kaddish, Sound on Sound magazine, January 1996.

Notes

1955 births
2005 deaths
Deaths from aortic aneurysm
English pop musicians
Jewish English musicians
People from Solihull
English male journalists